Osvaldo Montecillo Padilla (born 15 August 1942) is a Philippine prelate of the Catholic Church who spent his career in the diplomatic service of the Holy See. He became an archbishop in 1991 and the position of Apostolic Nuncio to several countries before retiring in 2017.

Biography
He was born on 5 August 1942 in Sogod, Cebu, Philippines.

On 17 December 1990, Pope John Paul II named him titular archbishop of Pia and Apostolic Nuncio to Panama. He received his episcopal consecration on 6 January 1991 from John Paul. In 1994, he was appointed Nuncio to Sri Lanka. On 22 August 1998, he was named Nuncio to Nigeria.

On 31 July 2003, he was appointed Nuncio to Costa Rica, and on 12 April 2008 Nuncio to Korea. On 26 April 2008, he was assigned in addition the position of Nuncio to Mongolia.

He retired on 15 September 2017. In retirement he lives in the Philippines.

He is the elder brother of Archbishop Francisco Padilla, also a Nuncio.

See also
 List of heads of the diplomatic missions of the Holy See

References

External links
 Archbishop Osvaldo Padilla at Catholic Hierarchy 

1942 births
Living people
Apostolic Nuncios to Panama
Apostolic Nuncios to Sri Lanka
Apostolic Nuncios to Nigeria
Apostolic Nuncios to Costa Rica
Apostolic Nuncios to South Korea
Apostolic Nuncios to Mongolia
Filipino Roman Catholic archbishops
People from Cebu
20th-century Roman Catholic titular archbishops
21st-century Roman Catholic titular archbishops